Agii or AGII may refer to :

 Ag(II), the chemical element silver with an oxidation state of two
 Ag-II, the propeptide of the antigen found in acquired Von Willebrand disease
 AGII, a type of plant mosaic potyvirus
 Agility II, a certificate of a dog's ability at dog agility sports, standardised by the United Kennel Club
 Angiotensin II, a hormone
 a transliteration of Greek 'Άγιοι' (Agioi), meaning 'saints'

See also
 Agai (disambiguation)
 Agaie Emirate, a historical state in present-day Nigeria 
 Agey, a commune in Côte-d'Or, Bourgogne, France
 AGG (disambiguation)
 Aggai (disambiguation)
 Agge (disambiguation)
 Aggey (disambiguation)
 Aggi (disambiguation)
 Aggie (disambiguation)
 Aggy (disambiguation)
 Agi (disambiguation)
 Agy, a commune in the Basse-Normandie région of France